Cybernat is a term used in the media of the United Kingdom to refer to online supporters of Scottish independence and the Scottish National Party.

The term was apparently coined by Lord Foulkes and was used by Scottish Labour leader Iain Gray in 2009. It gained greater prominence during 2013, after mainstream media sources reported that Sir Chris Hoy had been subject to online abuse for expressing his support for unionism in Scotland.

The Daily Telegraph reported in March 2014 that a retired soldier had received some abusive messages from Cybernats, after SNP politician Roseanna Cunningham posted a message on Twitter showing a letter from the soldier asking for donations to Better Together. In June 2014, J.K. Rowling was subjected to online abuse by Cybernats after donating to Better Together.

The Herald stated in February 2013 that: "The problem is not limited to the nationalist side of the referendum debate, with the SNP complaining of Unionist "unitrolls" spreading online abuse." It also reported that the Yes Scotland campaign would monitor blog sites and Twitter in an attempt to police offensive comments by supporters of independence. Christopher Stevenson, a British unionist and a fire safety technician from Glasgow, was convicted in August 2014 of behaving in a "threatening or abusive manner" for stating on Twitter that he "might assassinate Alex Salmond". Stevenson, who argued in court that his statement was meant as a joke, had sentence deferred for one year.

During the 2015 UK general election campaign, Labour called on the SNP to disown their candidate for Edinburgh South, Neil Hay, who had posted abusive comments on Twitter about Scottish unionists and elderly voters. Nicola Sturgeon, the SNP leader, condemned the comments but also pointed out that a Labour activist, Ian Smart, had abused nationalists. Labour subsequently suspended Smart from membership of the party. Charles Kennedy, former leader of the Liberal Democrats, was the target of on-line abuse during the campaign and immediately after the election. One person who had posted comments directed at Kennedy using a personal Twitter account was identified as Brian Smith, an SNP constituency official; the party declared that his comments were inappropriate and Smith quickly resigned.

Polling 
In March 2014 a Survation poll for the Scottish Sunday Express found that around 13% of Scots had been subject to abuse either online or face to face. The poll found that about 8% of those intending to vote No at the time had experienced such abuse with the figure for those intending to vote yes at 21%.

Post-referendum, a Panelbase poll for Wings over Scotland found that in terms of online abuse specifically, 11% of those who had voted No had experienced online abuse compared to 20% of those who had voted Yes.

References

Internet-based activism
Scottish independence
Scottish National Party